Austin Bold FC was an American professional soccer team located in Austin, Texas. Founded in 2017, the team made its debut in the USL Championship in 2019. In 2021, Austin Bold FC announced it would be moving to Fort Worth, Texas leaving Circuit of the Americas at the end of the season but may have to wait until 2023, depending on the construction of their stadium.  The team is not active for the 2022 & 2023 seasons.

Stadium 

The club played at Bold Stadium on the grounds of the Circuit of the Americas race track, located between the amphitheater and the grand plaza. The first goal in the stadium was scored by Kleber Giacomazzi in a 1–0 win against San Antonio FC on March 30, 2019.

Ownership
Bobby Epstein, chairman of the Circuit of the Americas, has led the ownership group after becoming majority owner in 2017. He became involved in a public relations battle with Anthony Precourt, the primary owner of Austin FC, who had been sanctioned by Major League Soccer to create a franchise in Austin after selling his stake in the Columbus Crew amid controversy. Epstein was criticized for his tactics, including hiring petition campaigners who are accused of lying to the public.

In December 2021 a new ownership group was approved by the USL. The new ownership group consists of Donnie Nelson, Neil Leibman, and  Epstein. The team will not participate in the 2022 USL Championship as it actively seeks relocation to another city in Texas.

Sponsorship

Players and staff

Roster

Staff

 Rick Abbott – acting general manager
 Catherine Ryland – team administrator
 Marcelo Serrano - sporting director
 Ryan Thompson – head coach
 Vacant – assistant coach
 Michael Alcaraz – goalkeeper coach
 Ally Furey – head athletic trainer
 Sarah Khalifa – assistant athletic trainer / assistant performance coach

Team records

Year-by-year

1. Top scorer includes statistics from league matches only.

Head coaches
 Includes USL regular season, USL playoffs, U.S. Open Cup. Excludes friendlies.

Average attendance

Honors

Minor
 Copa Tejas (Division 2)
 Winners (1): 2019

References

External links
 

 
USL Championship teams
2018 establishments in Texas
Sports teams in Austin, Texas
Association football clubs established in 2018
Soccer clubs in Texas